Robert Charles Hicks (April 4, 1927 – April 7, 2018) was an American football player and coach.  He served as the head football coach at Juniata College in Huntingdon, Pennsylvania from 1954 to 1955, DePauw University in Greencastle, Indiana from 1956 to 1958, and Wagner College in Staten Island, New York from 1962 to 1977, compiling a career college football coaching record of 102–79–8.

At Juniata, he led the Eagles to an undefeated record in each of his two seasons at the helm and an appearance in the 1956 Tangerine Bowl. Hicks played college football at Pennsylvania State University.

Head coaching record

References

External links
 

1927 births
2018 deaths
Albright Lions football coaches
DePauw Tigers football coaches
Detroit Titans football coaches
Juniata Eagles football coaches
Penn State Nittany Lions football players
Wagner Seahawks football coaches
People from Lancaster, Pennsylvania
Players of American football from Pennsylvania